"Too Much" is a song by the American rock band Blondie, written by Matthew Katz-Bohen and Laurel Katz-Bohen. It was released as the third single from their eleventh studio album Pollinator on June 12, 2017, in European countries as a CD single, as well as a digital download. Two versions of the single exist, the full-length album version released as a single in Europe, as well as a radio edit released to radio in America as well.

Background and cover art
The song was recorded in 2016, and was one of the first songs recorded for Pollinator. Lyrically, it is about recovering after a breakup after thinking that the relationship was meant to last and picking up the pieces and leaving, still remaining in love. The cover art released for the single is exactly the same blue version of the album cover used for the artwork of the promotional single "Tonight."

Critical reception
"Too Much" met with critical acclaim, as did the previous Pollinator's singles. The Key claims "Pierced with synths and one of the catchiest hooks on the record, “Too Much” is another contemporary classic." Mushroom Promotions states that this song "proves Blondie continues to evolve almost song by song." However, Under the Radar Magazine called it "slick and sticky," and "has little to offer outside of the chorus." The song has a rating of 3.18 out of 5 on Rate Your Music.  Despite critical acclaim, the song did not chart.

Track listings

References

2017 singles
2016 songs
Blondie (band) songs
Songs written by Matthew Katz-Bohen
Songs written by Laurel Katz-Bohen